Mian Mahalleh (also Romanized as Mīān Maḩalleh) is a village in Bala Khiyaban-e Litkuh Rural District, in the Central District of Amol County, Mazandaran Province, Iran. At the 2006 census, its population was 213, in 57 families.

References 

Populated places in Amol County